The 1981 Can Am series season was the fourteenth running of the Sports Car Club of America's prototype-based series, and the fifth running of the revived series. Geoff Brabham was declared champion, despite only winning two races. Chevrolet again dominated the season. The dominant chassis manufacturers were March, Lola, Holbert, Frissbee, and VDS. IndyCar drivers Al Unser and Bobby Rahal also podiumed at Road America and Mosport, respectively.

The two liter class went to Jim Trueman in his Ralt.

Results

References

Can-Am seasons
Can-Am
Can-Am